Glenn Clifton Jr., also known as Young Bleed is an American hip-hop artist based out of Baton Rouge, Louisiana.

Biography
Young Bleed started rhyming at the age of 9 at home in his native South Baton Rouge, Louisiana. He claims to have been influenced by his mother, who had read poetry to him from a young age, and by Run-DMC. By his teenage years, Bleed had begun recording his rhymes, selling hip-hop tapes independently to friends on the streets of his neighborhood. He was eventually signed to a local record label.  In 1995, he joined with four of his fellow Baton Rouge-based hip-hop artists – C-Loc, Max Minelli, J-Von, and J-Von's younger brother Chris Hamilton – to form the group Concentration Camp, with which he is still affiliated as of 2022.

Career
Young Bleed's first glimpse of national fame was when his song with C-Loc, “How You Do That”, was remixed by Master P of No Limit Records. It was released on the 1997 soundtrack to Master P's film I'm Bout It which peaked at number one on Billboard’s R&B/Hip Hop album charts in mid-1998.  Then, with the help of Master P, he signed a deal with Priority Records to release his major label debut album My Balls & My Word in 1998. The album peaked in at number ten on the Billboard 200 and number one on the Top R&B/Hip Hop album charts and also reached gold & later platinum status in the U.S. The follow-up My Own was released independently of No Limit on Priority, and although it charted on both the Billboard 200 and the Top R&B & Hip-Hop albums charts, it failed to make similar waves as its predecessor.

While in the process of recording his third solo album with Priority, Vintage, Young Bleed was released from his contract and forced to go independent. He joined C-Bo's West Coast Mafia Records and released Rise Thru da Ranks from Earner Tugh Capo in 2005 and Once Upon a Time in Amedica in 2007.

On September 23, 2008, Young Bleed released his fifth album, Off Tha Curb. It is a collaborative album with the up-and-coming rapper Freize.

Young Bleed was signed to a Strange Music subsidiary called Strange Lane Records in 2011, and his first album with the label, Preserved, was released on October 11, 2011. On April 24, 2012, it was announced that Young Bleed had been dropped from Strange Music and signed to another label. In late 2012, he announced his newest album, All Amedican, and revealed a release date for October or November 2012. However, the album was pushed back several times. It was due to be released in 2013, but as of 2021, it has not been.

In 2016, Young Bleed announced that he was working on a new studio album. The album was released on January 20, 2017.

On March 26, 2018 Young Bleed made an announcement that he'd be releasing a new album entitled  Wut' Uh' Life. It was the second project to be released under his Trap Door Entertainment aegis.

Trap Door Entertainment

Trap Door Entertainment is a Baton Rouge, Louisiana-based record label formed in 2010 by Young Bleed. It is currently operating independently.

Current artist
Young Bleed (Founder/CEO)
Ty'Gee Ramon

Discography

Collaboration albums

Mixtapes
Signs N' Wonders (Slopped Not Chopped) (Hosted by OG Ron C) - 2015
Signs N' Wonders (Slowed & Reverb) (Hosted by DJ Michael Douglas) - 2015
No Guidelines (Hosted by DJ Choice) - 2015
Country Boy Livin' (Blendtape) (Hosted by DJ Choice) - 2015

References

External links

 Young Bleed on Myspace

 Young Bleed Interview at HipHopDX

African-American male rappers
American male rappers
Capitol Records artists
Living people
Musicians from Baton Rouge, Louisiana
Place of birth missing (living people)
No Limit Records artists
Rappers from Louisiana
Gangsta rappers
21st-century American rappers
21st-century American male musicians
1974 births
21st-century African-American musicians
20th-century African-American people